, born , was a Japanese samurai (retainer of the Mito Domain) and a nationalist thinker of the Mito school during the late shogunate period.

In 1799 he became involved in the compilation of the Dai Nihon-shi (Great History of Japan) being undertaken by the Mito school.

In 1825 he wrote his Shinron ("New Theses"), a collection of essays that dealt with issues such as Tokugawa defence policy and how the ships were a threat to Japan. Aizawa also tried to describe conditions in the West and theorize why those states had gained so much control; in his opinion Westerners used religion to inculcate conformity in the masses.

He also claimed that Christianity was used by the colonial powers to subvert native cultures and governments by creating a fifth column that would collaborate with and facilitate military conquest by Europeans. He discussed the religious policies established by the Toyotomi government and continued by their successors, the Tokugawa shogunate, in this context.

Furthermore, he believed that if Japan's way of life was to survive, it would need to take up its own state religion in order to prevent cultural assimilation via Christianization and discussed the concept of kokutai ("national polity") in this context. The Shinron would become an important work for the sonnō jōi movement and his theory of the Kokutai would be developed by future thinkers.

In 1840 Aizawa became the first head of professors of the Mito school's Kōdōkan but was forced to resign in 1844 when Tokugawa Nariaki resigned as domain leader. He later returned to the Kōdōkan.

Quotes

See also
 Gaspar Coelho, who came into conflict with Toyotomi Hideyoshi over the issue of Christian subversion
 San Felipe incident (1596), after which Hideyoshi became convinced of Christian plans for the ultimate conquest of Japan

Sources

Notes

1781 births
1863 deaths
Samurai
Japanese nationalists
Anti-Christian sentiment
Japanese educators
19th-century Japanese philosophers
Writers from Ibaraki Prefecture
Japanese Confucianists